Mar Dadishoʿ was Catholicos of the East from 421 AD to 456 AD. During his reign as Catholicos, in 424 AD, the Church of the East declared itself independent of all other churches, resulting in Mar Dadishoʿ taking the title of Patriarch, becoming the first Catholicos-Patriarch of Seleucia-Ctesiphon.

References

Sources
 
 
 
 

4th-century deaths
Patriarchs of the Church of the East
Year of birth unknown
Christians in the Sasanian Empire
5th-century bishops of the Church of the East